Avrelya may refer to:
Avrelya, a diminutive of the Russian male first name Avrelian
Avrelya, a diminutive of the Russian male first name Avrely
Avrelya, a diminutive of the Russian female first name Avreliya